Hiram Keith Alex (born June 9, 1969) is a former American football guard in the  National Football League (NFL). He played for the Atlanta Falcons (1993) and the Minnesota Vikings (1995). Alex was a four-year letterman in football at Texas A&M University from 1987 to 1992. Following his senior year in 1991, he received Honorable Mention All-American accolades by the Football News and was also selected as an Associated Press First-team All-Southwest Conference offensive tackle. Keith Alex was the 9th-round pick (243rd overall) of the Atlanta Falcons in the 1992 NFL Draft. He is currently a physical education teacher and football coach at Cypress Springs High School. Alex has coached at Texas A&M as a graduate assistant coach, Arizona Western College as the offensive line coach, and in high school for the last eleven years.

External links
Keith Alex statistics

References

1969 births
Living people
People from Kountze, Texas
Players of American football from Texas
American football offensive guards
Texas A&M Aggies football players
Atlanta Falcons players
Minnesota Vikings players